William Norman McLaren,  LL. D. (11 April 1914 – 27 January 1987) was a Scottish Canadian animator, director and producer known for his work for the National Film Board of Canada (NFB). He was a pioneer in a number of areas of animation and filmmaking, including hand-drawn animation, drawn-on-film animation, visual music, abstract film, pixilation and graphical sound. McLaren was also an artist and printmaker, and explored his interest in dance in his films.

His films garnered numerous awards, including one Oscar, one Palme d'Or, three BAFTA Awards and six Venice Film Festival awards.

Early life 
Norman McLaren was born in Stirling, Scotland, on 11 April 1914. He had two older siblings, one brother, Jack and a sister, Sheena. At the age of 21, he travelled to Russia for a vacation which confirmed his communist beliefs; his father had paid for the trip in hopes of curing these beliefs.

When McLaren was 22, he left Stirling and studied set design at the Glasgow School of Art. While there, he joined the Kinecraft Society; within the society, he began to experiment with different styles and techniques of filmmaking. It was also at the Glasgow School of Art that McLaren met Helen Biggar, they produced films together outside the School and sought to have their productions released nationally.

His early experiments with film and animation included actually scratching and painting the film stock itself, as he did not have ready access to a camera. One of his earliest extant films, Seven Till Five (1935), a "day in the life of an art school" was influenced by Eisenstein and displays a strongly formalist attitude.

McLaren's film Camera Makes Whoopee (1935), was a more elaborate take on the themes explored in Seven Till Five, inspired by his acquisition of a Ciné-Kodak camera, which enabled him to execute a number of 'trick' shots. McLaren used what would later be called 'pixilation' effects, superimpositions and animation not only to display the staging of an art school ball, but also to tap into the aesthetic sensations supposedly produced by this event.

His two early films won prizes at the Scottish Amateur Film Festival, where fellow Scot and future NFB founder John Grierson was a judge.

Career

GPO Film Unit 
Grierson, who was at that time head of the UK General Post Office film unit, saw another of his movies at an amateur film festival and hired McLaren. McLaren worked at the GPO from 1936 to 1939, making eight films including Defence of Madrid, Book Bargain (1937), Mony a Pickle, Love on the Wing (1938), and News for the Navy (1938).

Solomon Guggenheim Foundation 
McLaren then moved to New York City in 1939, just as World War II was about to begin in Europe. With a grant from the Solomon Guggenheim Foundation, he worked in New York until 1941, making drawn-on-film animated works, including Boogie-Doodle (1940), along with Dots, Loops and Stars and Stripes.

NFB 
In 1941, at the invitation of Grierson, McLaren moved to Ottawa in 1941 to work for the National Film Board and open an animation studio and to train Canadian animators. Upon his arrival in Canada, he made two films with the American director  Mary Ellen Bute—Spook Sport and Tarantella. Grierson asked him to direct a promotional film reminding Canadians to mail their Christmas cards early, Mail Early (1941). He then worked on animated shorts as well as maps for Allied propaganda documentary films, followed by his War Bonds campaign films: V for Victory (1941), 5 for 4 (1942), Hen Hop (1942), Dollar Dance (1943) and Tic Tac Toe (1943). In 1943, he also produced the six-film series of animated French songs, Chants Populaire. In 1944 and 1945, he would do a similar series in English with Let's All Sing Together.

As of 1942, McLaren could no longer keep up with the demands for animation at the fast-growing NFB, and he was asked by Grierson to recruit art students and create a small animation team—a task made more difficult because many young students had gone off to fight in the war. McLaren found recruits for his fledgling animation unit at the École des beaux-arts de Montréal and the Ontario College of Art, including René Jodoin, George Dunning, Jim McKay, Grant Munro and his future collaborator, Evelyn Lambart. McLaren trained these emerging animators, who would all work on cartoons, animated cards and propaganda documentaries before going on to make their own films. Studio A, the NFB's first animation studio, formally came into existence as of January 1943, with McLaren as its head.

During his work for the NFB, McLaren made 70 films, including Begone Dull Care (1949), Rythmetic (1956), Christmas Cracker (1963), Pas de Deux (1968),  and the Oscar-winning Neighbours (1952), which is a brilliant combination of visuals and sound, and has a strong social message against violence and war. McLaren won the Short Film Palme d'Or at the Cannes Film Festival and the BAFTA Award for Best Animated Film for Blinkity Blank (1955), which he later selected as his diploma piece when he was inducted into the Royal Canadian Academy of Arts in 1974.

UNESCO 
In addition to film, McLaren worked with UNESCO in the 1950s and 1960s on programs to teach film and animation techniques in China and India. His five part "Animated Motion" shorts, produced in the late 1970s, are an excellent example of instruction on the basics of film animation.

Legacy 
McLaren is remembered for his experiments with image and sound as he developed a number of groundbreaking techniques for combining and synchronizing animation with music.

The National Film Board honoured McLaren by naming its Montreal head office building the Norman McLaren Building. The Montreal borough of Saint-Laurent, which is home to the NFB, has also honoured McLaren by naming a borough district after him.

In 1979, the new Edinburgh Filmhouse included two seats dedicated to McLaren and Grierson.

In 2006, McLaren was the subject of a short animated documentary McLaren's Negatives. Also in 2006, the Film Board marked the 65th anniversary of NFB animation with an international retrospective of McLaren's restored classics and a new DVD box set of his complete works.

In June 2013, the NFB released an iTunes app entitled "McLaren's Workshop," allowing users to create their own films using animation techniques utilized by McLaren and providing access to over fifty of his films.

In June 2018, Robert Lepage, principal dancer Guillaume Côté and the National Ballet of Canada staged a ballet entitled Frame by Frame, based on McLaren's life and work.

Birth centenary events 
The 100th anniversary of the birth of McLaren was marked by a project entitled "McLaren Wall-to-Wall" in Montreal's Quartier des Spectacles entertainment district, with short films inspired by McLaren works Neighbours, Begone Dull Care, Synchromy and Spheres projected onto local landmarks.

McLaren's centenary was also celebrated in Scotland with the McLaren 2014 Programme of screenings, exhibitions, events and animation workshops.  The Programme was conceived of and directed by animator Iain Gardner who also serves as the Animation Programmer for the Edinburgh International Film Festival.  The programme was a key focus within the 68th Edinburgh International Film Festival in June, and ran through to the end of the XX Commonwealth Games in Glasgow in August.  The McLaren 2014 Programme was managed by the Centre for the Moving Image, working in partnership with the National Film Board of Canada, and over 20 partners in Scotland and the UK.

In April 2014 his only surviving nephew Douglas Biggar (younger son of Sheena) unveiled a blue heritage plaque on his childhood home marking the centenary of his birth.

Honours
In 1968, McLaren was made an Officer of the Order of Canada and, in 1973,  Companion of the Order of Canada.

In 1954, the Locarno Film Festival included a block of programming title Homage to Norman McLaren.

In 1975, he was presented with the Winsor McCay Award in recognition of his lifetime contributions to the art of animation.

In 1977, he received an honorary doctorate from Concordia University.

In 1982, he was the first anglophone to receive the Prix Albert-Tessier, given to persons for an outstanding career in Québec cinema.

In 1985, McLaren was named Chevalier of the National Order of Quebec.

In 1986, he received a Lifetime Achievement Award at the World Festival of Animated Film – Animafest Zagreb.

In 2009, McLaren's works were added to UNESCO's Memory of the World Programme, listing the most significant documentary heritage collections in the world.

Personal life 
McLaren's life partner was fellow NFB director Guy Glover, whom he met at the ballet in London in 1937. They remained together until McLaren's death in 1987.

Filmography

Glasgow School of Art
Hand-Painted Abstractions, 1933 – co-director with Stewart McAllister
Seven Till Five, 1935 - producer, director
Camera Makes Whoopee, Glasgow School of Art 1935 - producer, director
Polychrome Phantasy, Glasgow School of Art 1935 - producer, director
Colour Cocktail, 1935 - producer, director
Hell Unlimited, 1936 - co-producer and co-director with Helen Biggar

GPO Film Unit
Defence of Madrid, 1936 - producer, co-director with Ivor Montagu
Book Bargain, 1937 - director, co-producer with Alberto Cavalcanti
Making a Book, 1937 - director 
A Job in a Million, Evelyn Spice Cherry 1937 - editor
Love on the Wing, 1938 - animator, producer, director
Mony a Pickle, 1938 - producer, co-director
News for the Navy, 1938 - producer, director
The Obedient Flame, 1939 - director

Independent
Allegro, 1939 - director, animator 
Rumba, 1939 - director, animator 
Scherzo, 1939 - producer, director
Snakes, 1940 - producer, director
La Perdriole, 1940 - producer, director
Little Negro, 1940 - producer, director
NBC Valentine's Greeting, 1940 - animator, producer, director
Stars and Stripes, 1940 - animator, producer, director
Dots, 1940 - animator, producer, director (released 1949)
Loops, 1940 - animator, producer, director (released 1949)
Boogie-Doodle, 1941 - animator, producer, director 
Blue Peter, TV series, BBC 1963 - animator, 2 episodes

National Film Board of Canada
Spook Sport, 1940 - director, co-producer with Mary Ellen Bute
Tarantella, Mary Ellen Bute and Ted Nemeth 1940 - animation 
Mail Early, 1941 - animator, producer, director
V is for Victory, 1941 - animator, producer, director
July 4th, 1941 - producer, director
Five for Four, 1942 - animator, producer, director
Hen Hop, 1942 - animator, producer, director
Barrel Zoom, 1943 - animator, producer, director
En roulant ma boule, Chants populaires No. 1, Jim MacKay 1943 - producer 
Envoyons d'l'avant nos gens, Chants populaires No. 2, Jean-Paul Ladouceur and George Dunning 1943 - producer
Là-bas sur ces montagnes, Chants populaires No. 3, Jim MacKay and George Dunning 1943 - producer
Filez, filez, ô mon navire, Chants populaires No. 4, Jim MacKay and George Dunning 1943 - producer
C'est l'aviron, Chants populaires No. 5, 1943 - producer, co-animator and co-director with Alexandre Alexeieff
Là-haut sur ces montagnes, Chants populaires No. 6, 1943 - animator, producer, director
Dollar Dance, 1943 - animator, producer, director
Tic Tac Toe, 1943 - producer
Alouette, 1944 - producer, co-director and co-animator with René Jodoin
A Rainy Day, 1944 - co-producer with Philip Ragan
Keep Your Mouth Shut, 1944 - producer, director
Let's All Sing Together: No. 1, 1944 - producer
Let's All Sing Together: No. 2, 1944 - producer
Let's All Sing Together: No. 3, 1945 - producer
Let's All Sing Together: No. 4, 1945 - producer
Let's All Sing Together: No. 5, 1945 - producer
Let's All Sing Together: No. 6, 1945 - producer
Hoppity Pop, 1946 - animator, producer, director
A Little Phantasy on a 19th-Century Painting, 1946 - animator, producer, director
Story of a Violin, Jacques Bobet 1947 - co-animator with Evelyn Lambart
Fiddle-de-dee, 1947 - animator, producer, director
La poulette grise, 1947 - animator, producer, director
Begone Dull Care, 1949 - producer, editor, co-animator and co-director with Evelyn Lambart
Dots, 1949 - animator, producer, director
Loops, 1949 - animator, producer, director
Over-Dependency, Robert Anderson 1949 - animator
Now is the Time, 1951 - animator, director, co-producer with Evelyn Lambart
Around Is Around, 1951 - producer, director, co-animator with Evelyn Lambart
On the Farm - Test, 1951 - director
Pen Point Percussion, 1951 - director, co-producer with Tom Daly
Neighbours, 1952 - music, animator, producer, director
A Phantasy, 1952 - animator, producer, director
Two Bagatelles, 1952 - music, animator, producer, co-director with Grant Munro
Twirligig, 1952 - producer
Ballet Adagio, 1953 - animator, producer, director
Blinkity Blank, 1955 - animator, producer, director
Rythmetic, 1956 - producer, co-director and co-animator with Evelyn Lambart
A Chairy Tale, 1957 - producer, co-director with Claude Jutra
Le Merle, 1958 - producer, director, co-animator with Evelyn Lambart
The Wonderful World of Jack Paar, 1959 - titles
Mail Early for Christmas, 1959 - animator, producer, director
Serenal, 1959 - animator, producer, director
Short and Suite, 1959 - director, producer, co-animator with Evelyn Lambart
Lines: Vertical, 1960 - producer, co-animator and co-director with Evelyn Lambart
Flicker Film - Test, 1961 - director
Times Square Animated Lightboard, 1960 - animator, director
New York Lightboard, 1961 - producer, director
Lines: Horizontal, 1962 - producer, co-animator and co-director with Evelyn Lambart 
Christmas Cracker, 1963 - co-director with Grant Munro, Gerald Potterton and Jeff Hale
Seven Surprizes - compilation 1963 - co-director with Grant Munro, and Claude Jutra
Canon - animated film, 1964 - co-producer and co-director with Grant Munro
Mosaic, 1965 - producer, co-animator and co-director with Evelyn Lambart
Korean Alphabet, Kim In Tae 1967 - sound
Pas de deux, 1968 - producer, director
Spheres, 1969 - co-producer, co-director and co-animator with René Jodoin
Synchromy, 1971 - music, visuals, producer, director
Pinscreen, 1973 - director
Animated Motion, Parts 1-5, 1976-78 - co-director and co-producer with Grant Munro
Narcissus, 1983 - director
Pas de deux and the Dance of Time, 1985 - co-director with Francine Viel

Awards

Hen Hop (1942)
World Festival of Film, Brussels: Special Award, 1949

A Little Phantasy on a 19th-Century Painting (1946)
 Salerno Short Film Festival, Salerno: Chamber of Commerce of Salerno Cup for Best Avant-garde Film, 1950

Fiddle-de-dee (1947)
 Salerno Short Film Festival, Salerno, Italy: First Prize, Gulf of Salerno Trophy of the Festival, 1950
 International Review of Specialized Cinematography, Rome: Certificate of Honour, Film Production in General, 1955
 International Review of Specialized Cinematography, Rome: Diploma of Honour, 1957
World Festival of Film, Brussels: Special Award, 1949

Begone Dull Care (1949)
 Venice Film Festival, Venice: First Prize, Art Films, 1950
 2nd Canadian Film Awards, Ottawa: Special Award, Experimentation, 1950
 Salerno Short Film Festival, Salerno: Honourable Mention, Miscellaneous Film, 1950
 Berlin International Film Festival, Berlin: Silver Medal, Documentary Short Film, 1951
 American Federation of Arts and Film Advisory Center Film Festival, Woodstock, New York: Best Experimental Film, 1952
 Durban International Film Festival, Durban: First Place, Silver Medal, Experimental, 1954

Dots (1940) and Loops (1940) (released together 1949)
 1st Canadian Film Awards, Ottawa: Special Award for Experimental Film, 1949
 International Review of Specialized Cinematography, Rome: Diploma of Honour, 1955
 Salerno Short Film Festival, Salerno:  Honourable Mention, Miscellaneous Film, 1950

Pen Point Percussion (1951)
 Venice Film Festival, Venice: Honourable Mention, Experimental Films, 1951

Now is the Time (1951)
 4th Canadian Film Awards, Special Award for Experimental Filmmaking, 1952 (with Around Is Around)

Around Is Around (1951)
 BFI London Film Festival, London: Nominee: Best Animation, 1957
 4th Canadian Film Awards, Special Award for Experimental Filmmaking, 1952 (with Now is the Time)

Neighbours (1952)
 25th Academy Awards, Los Angeles: Oscar for Best Documentary, Short Subject, 1953
 Boston Film Festival, Boston: Award of Merit, Adult Education, 1953
 5th Canadian Film Awards, Montreal: Honourable Mention, 1953
 Salerno Short Film Festival, Salerno: Gulf of Salerno Grand Trophy, 1954
 Yorkton Film Festival, Yorkton, Saskatchewan: Third Award, Sociology, 1954
 International Review of Specialized Cinematography, Rome: Certificate of Honour, 1955
 International Review of Specialized Cinematography, Rome: Diploma of Honour, 1957
 Golden Gate International Film Festival, San Francisco: Redwood Award for Special Merit, Film as Communication, 1967
 Calvin Workshop Awards, Kansas City, Missouri: Notable Film Award, 1968
 25th Academy Awards, Los Angeles: Nominee: Best Live Action, Short Subject, 1953

A Phantasy (1952)
 Venice Film Festival, Venice: Second Prize, Experimental Films, 1952
 Boston Film Festival, Boston: First Place, Arts, 1953
 5th Canadian Film Awards, Montreal: Special Award, Non-Theatrical, 1953

Blinkity Blank (1955)
 Cannes Film Festival, Cannes: Short Film Palme d'Or, 1955 
  9th British Academy Film Awards, London: BAFTA Award for Best Animated Film, 1956
 Berlin International Film Festival, Berlin: Silver Bear, 1955
 Franco-American International Film Festival, Paris: Fourth Prize, 1955
 Edinburgh International Film Festival, Edinburgh: Diploma of Merit, 1955
 Cape Town International Film Festival, Cape Town: Certificate of Merit, Documentary, 1955
 Durban International Film Festival, Durban: Certificate of Merit, Documentary, 1955
 SODRE International Festival of Documentary and Experimental Films, Montevideo, Uruguay: First Honourable Mention, Experimental Films, 1956

Rythmetic (1956)
 6th Berlin International Film Festival, Berlin: Silver Bear, Short Films, 1956
 Edinburgh International Film Festival, Edinburgh: Diploma of Merit, 1956
 Rapallo International Film Festival, Rapallo, Italy: First Prize, Abstract Films, 1957
 International Review of Specialized Cinematography, Rome: Diploma of Honour, 1957
 Chicago Festival of Contemporary Arts, University of Illinois Chicago: First Prize 1957
 Golden Reel International Film Festival, Film Council of America, New York: Silver Reel Award, Avant-Garde and Experimental, 1957
 Durban International Film Festival, Durban: Certificate of Merit, 1957
 Johannesburg International Film Festival, Johannesburg: Certificate of Merit, 1957

A Chairy Tale (1957)
 Venice Film Festival, Venice: First Prize, Experimental and Avant-garde, 1957
11th British Academy Film Awards, London: Special BAFTA Award for “work lying outside the feature and documentary fields”, 1958
 Rapallo International Film Festival, Rapallo, Italy: Second Prize, Experimental, 1958
 10th Canadian Film Awards, Toronto: Award of Merit, Non-Theatrical, Arts and Experimental, 1958
 30th Academy Awards, Los Angeles: Nominee: Best Live Action Short Subject, 1958

Le Merle (1958) 
 SODRE International Festival of Documentary and Experimental Films, Montevideo, Uruguay: Honourable Mention, 1956
 Locarno Film Festival, Locarno, Switzerland: Diploma of Honour, 1958
 World Festival of Film, Brussels: First Prize for Best Use of Colour, 1958
 Ibero-American-Filipino Documentary Film Contest, Bilbao: Special Mention, 1959
 International Review of Specialized Cinematography, Rome: Diploma of Honour, 1959
 American Film and Video Festival, New York: Blue Ribbon, Films as Art, 1960

Short and Suite (1959)
 Venice Film Festival, Venice: CIDALC Prize, 1959
 Bergamo Film Meeting, Bergamo: Special Mention, 1959

Serenal (1959)
 Ibero-American-Filipino Documentary Film Contest, Bilbao: Special Mention, 1959
 Bergamo Film Meeting, Bergamo: Special Mention, 1959
San Sebastián International Film Festival, San Sebastián: Special Mention, 1959

Lines: Vertical (1960)
 Venice Film Festival, Venice: First Prize, Experimental, 1960
 BFI London Film Festival, London: Outstanding Film of the Year for Presentation, 1960
 Edinburgh International Film Festival, Edinburgh: Diploma of Merit, 1960
 CIDALC Festival of Music and Dance in Film, Valencia: First Prize, 1961
 13th Canadian Film Awards, Toronto: Best Film, Arts and Experimental, 1961

New York Lightboard (1961)
 Festival of Tourist and Folklore Films, Brussels: Special Jury Prize for Originality, 1961

Christmas Cracker (1963)
 Golden Gate International Film Festival, San Francisco: First Prize, Best Animated Short, 1964
 Electronic, Nuclear and Teleradio Cinematographic Review, Rome: Grand Prize for Technique, Films for Children, 1965
 Electronic, Nuclear and Teleradio Cinematographic Review, Rome: Grand Prize for Animation Technique, 1965
 Film Centrum Foundation Film Show, Naarden, Netherlands: Silver Squirrel, Second Prize 1966
 Philadelphia International Festival of Short Films, Philadelphia: Award of Exceptional Merit, 1967
 Landers Associates Annual Awards, Los Angeles: Award of Merit, 1965
 37th Academy Awards, Los Angeles: Nominee: Best Short Subject – Cartoons, 1965

Canon (1964)
 Montreal International Film Festival, Montreal: First Prize, Best Animated Film, 1965
 3rd International Film Festival of India, New Delhi: Bronze Peacock, Second Prize, 1965
 17th Canadian Film Awards, Toronto: Genie Award for Best Film, Arts and Experimental, 1965

Mosaic (1965)
 Vancouver International Film Festival, Vancouver: Certificate of Merit, 1965
 FIBA International Festival of Buenos Aires, Buenos Aires: First Prize, 1966
 Melbourne Film Festival, Melbourne: First Prize, 1966
 American Film and Video Festival, New York: Blue Ribbon, 1966
 Calvin Workshop Awards, Kansas City, Missouri: Notable Film Award, 1966

Pas de deux (1968)
 22nd British Academy Film Awards, London: BAFTA Award for Best Short Animation, 1969
 BFI London Film Festival, London: Outstanding Film of the Year, 1968
 Chicago International Film Festival, Chicago: Special Plaque of the Jury, 1968 
 20th Canadian Film Awards, Toronto: Special Prize for Outstanding Artistic Achievement, 1968
 FIBA International Festival of Buenos Aires, Buenos Aires: Silver Cabildo for the Most Original Film, 1968
 Cambodia International Film Festival, Phnom Penh: First Prize, Short Film, 1968
 Locarno Film Festival, Locarno, Switzerland: Diploma of Honour, 1968
 Melbourne International Film Festival, Melbourne: Grand Prize, Short Subject, 1969
 Film Critics and Journalists Association of Ceylon, Colombo, Sri Lanka: Golden Plaque, Short Film, 1969
 International Film Festival of Ballet, Nervi: Silver Orchid Award, 1969
 Yorkton Film Festival, Yorkton, Saskatchewan: First Place, Creative Art, 1969
 Colombo International Film Festival, Colombo, Sri Lanka: Honourable Mention, Short Film, 1969
 Salerno Short Film Festival, Salerno, Italy: Trophy of the Festival, 1970
 Panama International Film Festival, Panama City, Panama: Award for Best Short Film, 1970
 International Festival of Short Films, Philadelphia: Top Film of the Festival, 1971
 American Film and Video Festival, New York: Blue Ribbon, 1970
 American Film and Video Festival, New York: Emily Award, 1970
 Festival of Music and Dance, Menton: Prize of the Secretary of State to the Prime Minister in charge of Youth, Sports and Leisure, 1971
 41st Academy Awards, Los Angeles: Nominee (as Duo): Best Live Action Short Subject, 1969

Spheres (1969)
 International Festival of Experimental and Documentary Films, Córdoba, Argentina: Special Mention, Experimental, 1970

Synchronomy (1971)
 International Week of Cinema in Colour, Barcelona: Gold Medal, 1971
 Annecy International Animation Film Festival, Annecy: Special Jury Mention, Short Films, 1971
 Philadelphia International Festival of Short Films, Philadelphia: Award of Exceptional Merit, 1971
 FIBA International Festival of Buenos Aires, Buenos Aires: Cabildo de Plata for Most Original Film, 1972
 Melbourne Film Festival, Melbourne: Silver Boomerang, 1972
 American Film and Video Festival, New York: Blue Ribbon, Experimental, 1972
 Rockville Film Festival, Rockville, Maryland: Certificate of Honour, 1972

Ballet Adagio (1972)
 Atlanta Film Festival: Silver Medal, Live Action Short, 1973
 Columbus International Film & Animation Festival, Columbus, Ohio: Bronze Plaque, Art and Culture, 1973
 Melbourne International Film Festival, Melbourne: Diploma of Merit, 1973
 Tisquesusa Dorado International Festival of Short Films, Bogotá: First Prize, Artistic Field, 1980

Animated Motion (1976) 
 Athens International Film/Video Festival, Athens, Georgia: Special Merit Award, 1978

Narcissus (1983)
 International Film Festival of India, New Delhi: Golden Peacock for Best Short Film of the Festival, 1984
 Dance on Camera Festival, New York: Gold Star Award, 1984
 Yorkton Film Festival, Yorkton: Golden Sheaf for Best Experimental Film, 1984
 American Film and Video Festival, New York: Honorable Mention, Visual Essays, 1984
 Columbus International Film & Animation Festival, Columbus, Ohio: Honorable Mention, 1984
 Cartagena International Film Festival, Murcia, Spain: Special Mention 1985
 International Romantic Film Festival, Divonne-les-Bains: First Prize/Madame de Stael Prize, 1985

See also 
 René Jodoin
 Motion graphics
 Steven Woloshen
 Evelyn Lambart
 Grant Munro

References

Bibliography 
 Burant, Jim. Ottawa Art & Artists: An Illustrated History. Toronto: Art Canada Institute, 2022. 
 Dominique Chateau, "Norman McLaren : pensée-cinéma et cinéplastique", Nouvelles Vues, issue 17, winter-spring 2016 : https://web.archive.org/web/20160809181327/http://www.nouvellesvues.ulaval.ca/no-17-hiver-2016-cinema-et-philosophie-par-s-santini-et-p-a-fradet/articles/norman-mclaren-pensee-cinema-et-cineplastique-par-dominique-chateau/
 Raphaël Bassan, "Norman McLaren : le silence de Prométhée", in Les Cahiers de Paris expérimental, no 17 (in French) (2004)*
 Olivier Cotte (2007) Secrets of Oscar-winning animation: Behind the scenes of 13 classic short animations. (Making of Neighbours) Focal Press. 
 Alfio Bastiancich, "Norman McLaren: Précurseur des Nouvelles Images", Dreamland èditeur, Paris (1997) (in French) 
 Rogers, Holly and Jeremy Barham: The Music and Sound of Experimental Film, New York: Oxford University Press, 2017.
 Burant, Jim. Ottawa Art & Artists: An Illustrated History. Toronto: Art Canada Institute, 2022. ISBN 978-1-4871-0289-0

External links 
 
 NFB YouTube official channel
 Films of Norman McLaren at the National Film Board of Canada website
 Norman McLaren: Hands-on Animation and  Creative Process: Norman McLaren  at the National Film Board of Canada website
Canadian Film Encyclopedia
 Order of Canada Citation
 Norman McLaren on screenonline
 
 Norman McLaren Archive at the University of Stirling Archive

1914 births
1987 deaths
People educated at Stirling High School
Alumni of the Glasgow School of Art
Anglophone Quebec people
BAFTA winners (people)
British cinema pioneers
Canadian animators
Canadian experimental filmmakers
Canadian cinema pioneers
Companions of the Order of Canada
Directors of Best Documentary Short Subject Academy Award winners
Drawn-on-film animators
Canadian Screen Award winners
Graphical sound
International Animated Film Association
Knights of the National Order of Quebec
Canadian gay artists
LGBT film directors
Film directors from Montreal
People from Stirling
Scottish communists
Scottish emigrants to Canada
Scottish film directors
Stop motion animators
Visual music artists
Scottish gay artists
National Film Board of Canada people
Civil servants in the General Post Office
LGBT animators
Canadian people of British descent
Prix Albert-Tessier winners
20th-century Canadian LGBT people